Federal elections were held in Switzerland on 25 October 1931. Although the Social Democratic Party received the most votes, the Free Democratic Party remained the largest party in the National Council, winning 52 of the 187 seats.

Results

National Council

By constituency

Council of States
In several cantons the members of the Council of States were chosen by the cantonal parliaments.

By constituency

References

Switzerland
1931 in Switzerland
Federal elections in Switzerland
Federal
October 1931 events